The X Factor was an Australian television reality music competition, based on the original UK series, to find new singing talent; the winner of which received a Sony Music Australia recording contract and a management deal. The fifth season premiered on the Seven Network on 29 July 2013 and ended on 28 October 2013. The winner was Dami Im and her winner's single "Alive" was released after the final. Im was mentored throughout by Dannii Minogue, who won as mentor for the first time on the Australian series, and third overall. The show was presented by Luke Jacobz, and Ronan Keating and Natalie Bassingthwaighte returned as judges. Minogue and Redfoo joined the judging panel as replacements for former judges, Mel B (who quit the show to join America's Got Talent) and Guy Sebastian.

Open auditions in front of the show's producers took place in 14 cities throughout December 2012 and January 2013. The last set of auditions, in front of the judges and a live studio audience, were filmed in April. Following auditions was super bootcamp, where Keating, Minogue and Redfoo worked together and collectively chose 24 acts (six from each category). Bassingthwaighte did not attend the Sydney auditions and bootcamp because she was pregnant at the time and was advised not to fly from her home in Melbourne. During bootcamp, the Over 25s category was changed to Over 24s. Bassingthwaighte returned for the home visits stage, and each judge reduced their six acts to three. They were also assisted by guest mentors Jon Bon Jovi, will.i.am, Kylie Minogue, Kelly Osbourne and Sebastian.

The live shows, which began on 25 August 2013, returned to Sunday and Monday nights as seen in season two. This was a change of format from seasons three and four, in which the live shows were broadcast on Monday and Tuesday nights.

Judges

In February 2013, it was reported that Guy Sebastian would not be returning for season 5, due to tour commitments and to focus on a music career in the United States. It was also reported that Mel B was not returning, due to visa issues in Australia and her commitments with America's Got Talent. The following month, Ronan Keating confirmed in an interview with News Limited that both judges had left. Former judge on The X Factor UK, Dannii Minogue was announced as Mel B's replacement on 12 April. The Sunday Telegraph confirmed on 21 April that Redfoo would be Sebastian's replacement.

Redfoo was offered the opportunity to join the judging panel during his visit to Australia for the 2013 Australian Open, where he was supporting girlfriend and then-World number-one Victoria Azarenka. The producers later visited his recording studio in Hollywood and explained to him what The X Factor is about. In an interview with The West Australian, Redfoo said "they basically explained the show because I didn't know if I wanted to just be a judge. And they said 'Wait a second, wait a second, no it's not just judging, that's just to pick your team. Then you're really a mentor, you're going to be mentoring a category.' Then they said 'You can be a winner too.'" Minogue revealed to The Daily Telegraph that she was offered many other TV roles but chose to join The X Factor because she had always been a fan of the Australian version.

Selection process

Auditions
Open auditions in front of the show's producers began in December 2012 and ended in January 2013. These auditions took place in 14 cities. Online and DVD auditions were also introduced into the season for those who could not attend the open auditions. The auditionees chosen by the producers were then invited back to the last set of auditions that took place in front of the judges and a live studio audience. These auditions were filmed at Allphones Arena in Sydney on 21, 22 and 23 April, and at Hisense Arena in Melbourne on 28, 29 and 30 April. Natalie Bassingthwaighte did not attend the Sydney auditions because she was pregnant at the time and was advised not to fly from her home in Melbourne.

Super bootcamp
The super bootcamp stage of the competition was filmed at The Star casino in Pyrmont, New South Wales. Bassingthwaighte did not attend because she was on maternity leave. The first day of bootcamp saw the judges split the 150 acts into four categories: Boys, Girls, Over 25s and Groups. Each act performed one song in front of their entire category and the judges. At the end of the day, the judges sent home 75 acts. On the second day, the remaining acts were put into ensembles of 10 and were each given a song which they had to learn and perform for the judges. Season four winner Samantha Jade helped each ensemble with stage presence and choreography. The judges sent home more acts, but called back some rejected soloists from the Boys and Girls categories to form three supergroups – a boy band (consisting of Fabian Andres, Zac Hakos, Jayden Rodrigues and Nick Tabone), girl group (consisting of Jessica Kent, Dina Knoweiss, Rebecca Quinn and Carla Wehbe) and unisex group (consisting of Kelebek, Jacinta Gulisano and Jordan Rodrigues). On the third day, the remaining 50 acts each individually performed one song to the judges and a live audience of one thousand. After the performances, the judges narrowed down the acts to 24. Redfoo suggested that the Over 25s category be changed to Over 24s. The judges removed Zac Hakos from the boy band because they felt his heart was not in the group.

The 24 successful acts were:
Boys: Georgie Bannard, Omar Dean, Taylor Henderson, Mitchell Thompson, Ofisa "Tee" Toleafoa, Jai Waetford
Girls: Joelle Hadjia, Ellie Lovegrove, Georgina Mastin, Riv Ngwenya, Jiordan Tolli, Vendulka Wichta
Over 24s: Tyler Hudson, Dami Im, Michael Ross, Barry Southgate, Gemma Thorpe, Cat Vas
Groups: Adira–Belle, Boy Band, Girl Group, JTR, Straight Up, Third Degree

Matt Gresham had originally been put through to Home Visits in the Over 24s category but decided he could not commit to the competition and was replaced by Dami Im.

Home visits
The home visits round was filmed in June 2013 and saw the remaining 24 acts travel to exclusive locations around the world to find out which judge would become their mentor. The judges received news of their categories from The X Factor creator Simon Cowell by telephone. The Over 24s travelled to New York City and were assigned to Dannii Minogue, the Groups travelled to Sir Richard Branson's Makepeace Island in Sunshine Coast, Queensland and were assigned to Natalie Bassingthwaighte, the Boys travelled to Los Angeles and were assigned to Ronan Keating, and the Girls travelled to London and were assigned to Redfoo. The first day of home visits saw each act having a private mentoring session with their mentor, ahead of their solo performance in front of their mentor and guest mentor the next day. Redfoo was assisted by Jon Bon Jovi during the mentoring sessions for the Girls.

On the second day, each judge was given a guest mentor to help them decide their final three acts. Bassingthwaighte was assisted by former X Factor judge Guy Sebastian, Redfoo was assisted by will.i.am, Keating was assisted by Kelly Osbourne (who replaced Miley Cyrus due to laryngitis) and Minogue was assisted by her older sister Kylie.

Acts 

Key:
 – Winner
 – Runner-Up

Live shows

Results summary
Colour key
 Act in Team Dannii
 Act in Team Redfoo 
 Act in Team Natalie Bassingthwaighte
 Act in Team Ronan

  – Act in the bottom two and had to perform again in the final showdown
  – Act received the fewest public votes and was immediately eliminated (no final showdown)

Notes
1 Redfoo was not required to vote as there was already a majority.
2 Bassingthwaighte was not required to vote as there was already a majority.

Live show details

Week 1 (25/26 August)
 Theme: Judges' Choice
 Group performance: "I Like It"
 Celebrity performers: Samantha Jade ("Firestarter") and Jessie J ("It's My Party")

 Judges' vote to eliminate
 Bassingthwaighte: Barry Southgate – backed her own act, Adira–Belle.
 Minogue: Adira–Belle – backed her own act, Barry Southgate.
 Redfoo: Adira–Belle – based his decision on the final showdown performances and who really wanted to stay.
 Keating: Adira–Belle – was not sure if they would survive the next week.

 Notes
On 31 August 2013, the performances of three finalists entered the ARIA Singles Chart. Dami Im's performance of "One" debuted at number 52, Jai Waetford's performance of "Fix You" debuted at number 55 and Taylor Henderson's performance of "I Won't Let You Go" debuted at number 84. The following week, "One" peaked at number 42.

Week 2 (1/2 September)
 Theme: Legends
 Group performance: "Thank You" and "Classic" with MKTO
 Celebrity performers: Ricki-Lee ("Come & Get in Trouble with Me") and John Newman ("Love Me Again")

 Judges' vote to eliminate
 Keating: Cat Vas – stated that he was rooting for Joelle.
 Minogue: Joelle – backed her own act, Cat Vas.
 Redfoo: Cat Vas – backed his own act, Joelle.
 Bassingthwaighte: Cat Vas – felt Joelle had more to give.

 Notes
On 7 September 2013, the performances of two finalists entered the ARIA Singles Chart. Dami Im's performance of "Purple Rain" debuted at number 29 and Jiordan Tolli's performance of "Thriller" debuted at number 63.

Week 3 (8/9 September)
 Theme: Top 10 Hits
 Group performance: "Can You Feel It"
 Celebrity performers: 
Sunday – Redfoo ("Let's Get Ridiculous")
Monday – The Collective ("Another Life") and Miguel ("Adorn")

 Judges' vote to eliminate
 Bassingthwaighte: Barry Southgate – backed her own act, JTR.
 Redfoo: Barry Southgate – felt Southgate was missing strong vocal performances.
 Minogue: JTR – backed her own act, Barry Southgate.
 Keating: Barry Southgate – went with his gut.

 Notes
On 14 September 2013, the performances of three finalists entered the ARIA Singles Chart. Taylor Henderson's performance of "I Will Wait" debuted at number 64, Dami Im's performance of "Don't Leave Me This Way" debuted at number 67 and Jai Waetford's performance of "The Way You Make Me Feel" debuted at number 97.

Week 4 (15/16 September)
 Theme: Latest and Greatest
 Group performance: "Pompeii"
 Celebrity performers: Rudimental ("Right Here" / "Feel the Love") and Kodaline ("High Hopes")

 Judges' vote to eliminate
 Redfoo: JTR – backed his own act, Ellie Lovegrove.
 Minogue: Ellie Lovegrove – stated that JTR has improved more.
 Bassingthwaighte: Ellie Lovegrove – backed her own act, JTR.
 Keating: JTR – could not decide so chose to take it to deadlock.

With the acts in the bottom two receiving two votes each, the result went to deadlock and reverted to the earlier public vote. Ellie Lovegrove was eliminated as the act with the fewest public votes.

 Notes
On 21 September 2013, the performances of two finalists entered the ARIA Singles Chart. Dami Im's performance of "Roar" debuted at number 44 and Taylor Henderson's performance of "Let Her Go" debuted at number 85.

Week 5 (22/24 September)
 Theme: Rock
 Group performance: "Love Will Save the Day" and "Picture of You" with Boyzone
 Celebrity performers: Capital Cities ("Safe and Sound") and Karmin ("Acapella")

 Judges' vote to eliminate
 Keating: Joelle – went with his gut.
 Bassingthwaighte: Joelle – felt that Tolli had a better run vocally throughout the live shows.
 Minogue: Joelle – stated that Tolli had developed more.
 Redfoo was not required to vote as there was already a majority, he did not say how he would have voted as both acts were in his category.

 Notes
 This week's results show aired on Tuesday night due to the Seven Network's coverage of the 2013 Brownlow Medal.
On 28 September 2013, the performances of three finalists entered the ARIA Singles Chart. Joelle's performance of "Joey" debuted at number 33, Taylor Henderson's performance of "Choirgirl" debuted at number 51 and Dami Im's performance of "Best of You" debuted at number 78.

Week 6 (29/30 September)
 Theme: Family Heroes
 Group performance: "Counting Stars"
 Celebrity performers: Jessica Mauboy ("Pop a Bottle (Fill Me Up)") and Jason Derulo ("Talk Dirty")

 Judges' vote to eliminate
 Keating: JTR – felt JTR had struggled in recent weeks.
 Minogue: JTR – because it was JTR's third time in the bottom two.
 Redfoo: JTR – went with his gut.
 Bassingthwaighte was not required to vote as there was already a majority and did not say how she would have voted as both acts were in her category.

 Notes
On 5 October 2013, the performances of three finalists entered the ARIA Singles Chart. Dami Im's performance of "Bridge over Troubled Water" debuted at number 15, Taylor Henderson's performance of "The Horses" debuted at number 27 and Jai Waetford's performance of "That Should Be Me" debuted at number 83.
This is the first week where Dami Im didn't receive a standing ovation from all 4 judges
Based on the voting percentages, it was noted that Dami Im received more than 60% of the votes from the public

Week 7 (6/7 October)
 Theme: Judges' Challenge
 Group performance: "We Come Running"
 Celebrity performers: Nathaniel Willemse ("You") and James Blunt ("Bonfire Heart")

 Judges' vote to eliminate
 Keating: Jiordan Tolli – backed his own act, Omar Dean.
 Redfoo: Omar Dean – backed his own act, Jiordan Tolli.
 Bassingthwaighte: Omar Dean – stated that Tolli has more to deliver.
 Minogue: Jiordan Tolli – could not decide and sent the result to deadlock.

With the acts in the bottom two receiving two votes each, the result went to deadlock and reverted to the earlier public vote. Omar Dean was eliminated as the act with the fewest public votes.

 Notes
Omar Dean's elimination ended a record streak of six consecutive weeks where all three acts from one category had been safe without ever landing in the bottom two.
All six acts received standing ovations for their performances. 
On 12 October 2013, the performances of five finalists entered the ARIA Singles Chart. Taylor Henderson's performance of "Wake Me Up" debuted at number 49, Dami Im's performance of "Clarity" debuted at number 77, Jiordan Tolli's performance of "Royals" debuted at number 81, Third Degree's performance of "Pump It" debuted at number 84 and Jai Waetford's performance of "Somewhere Only We Know" debuted at number 95.

Week 8: Quarter-Final (13/14 October)
 Theme: Aussie Week
 Group performance: "Impossible"
 Celebrity performers: Havana Brown ("Warrior") and James Arthur ("You're Nobody 'til Somebody Loves You")

 Judges' vote to eliminate
 Redfoo: Third Degree – backed his own act, Jiordan Tolli.
 Minogue: Jiordan Tolli – because it was Tolli's third time in the bottom two.
 Bassingthwaighte: Jiordan Tolli – backed her own act, Third Degree.
 Keating: Third Degree – could not decide and sent the result to deadlock.

With the acts in the bottom two receiving two votes each, the result went to deadlock and reverted to the earlier public vote. Jiordan Tolli was eliminated as the act with the fewest public votes.

 Notes
 With Jiordan Tolli eliminated, Redfoo had no more remaining acts to mentor.
On 19 October 2013, Taylor Henderson's performance of "One Crowded Hour" debuted at number 38 on the ARIA Singles Chart.

Week 9: Semi-Final (20/21 October)
 Theme: Power and Passion
 Mentor: Tina Arena
 Celebrity performers: Imagine Dragons ("On Top of the World"), Tina Arena ("You Set Fire to My Life"), and Little Mix ("Move")

 Judges' vote to send through to the Grand Final
 Keating: Taylor Henderson – backed his own act, Taylor Henderson.
 Bassingthwaighte: Third Degree – backed her own act, Third Degree.
 Minogue: Third Degree – stated that a BAND could sell more records.
 Redfoo: Taylor Henderson – went with his gut.

With the acts in the bottom two receiving two votes each, the result went to deadlock and reverted to the earlier public vote. Taylor Henderson advanced to the final as the act with the most public votes.

Notes
With Third Degree eliminated, Bassingthwaighte had no more remaining acts to mentor.
On 26 October 2013, the performances of the four finalists entered the ARIA Singles Chart. Taylor Henderson's performance of "Girls Just Want to Have Fun" debuted at number two, Dami Im's performances of "Wrecking Ball" and "Saving All My Love for You" debuted at numbers 61 and 85 respectively, Jai Waetford's performance of "Dynamite" debuted at number 89, Henderson's performance of "Against All Odds" debuted at number 90 and Third Degree's performance of "Pound the Alarm" debuted at number 96.
This is the first week where Dami Im lost her 1st place spot to Jai Waetford in the public voting but still made it to the Grand Final

Week 10: Final (27/28 October)
27 October
Group performance: "LaserLight" (performed by top three finalists)
Celebrity performers: One Direction ("Best Song Ever")

Jai Waetford received the fewest public votes and was automatically eliminated.

28 October
Group performances:
"Blow" (performed by top twelve finalists)
"Alone Together" with Fall Out Boy (performed by top three finalists)
Celebrity performers: Guy Sebastian ("Like a Drum") and Katy Perry ("Roar" and "Unconditionally")

Notes
For the first time this season there was no theme.
On 2 November 2013, performances from the top three finalists entered the ARIA Singles Chart. Jai Waetford's performance of "Don't Let Me Go" debuted at number 37, Taylor Henderson's performances of "The Blower's Daughter" and "Some Nights" debuted at numbers 43 and 45 respectively, and Dami Im's performances of "And I Am Telling You I'm Not Going" and "Hero" debuted at numbers 29 and 62 respectively.
Based on the voting percentages, Dami Im won with 56.2% of votes compared to 29.56% of Taylor Henderson. (Jai Waetford carry over freeze votes: 14.24%)

Ratings
 Colour key:
  – Highest rating during the season
  – Lowest rating during the season

See also
Television in Australia

References

External links
 The X Factor at Yahoo!7

Season 5
2013 Australian television seasons
Australia 05